Italma (acronym of Italiano Alluminio Magnesio) is an aluminium alloy. It was produced by A.S.A. (Alluminio Soc. Anonima) and was introduced shortly after World War II in order to being used in the new coinage of the Italian lira, which lasted until the adoption of the Italian euro coins in 2002. It comprised 96.2% aluminium, 3.5% magnesium, and 0.3% manganese.

Bibliography
Giovanni Calchera, "Le nuove monete metalliche della Repubblica Italiana", in Annuario Numismatico Rinaldi, 1948 (in Italian).

See also 
Acmonital

Aluminium–magnesium alloys
Coinage metals and alloys